The fourth season of the Peruvian reality singing competition La Voz Perú premiered on 14 June 2021, on Latina Televisión, and the show returned after six years of hiatus. Eva Ayllón returns as coach, joined by newcomers Mike Bahia, Daniela Darcourt, and Guillermo Dávila. Cristian Rivero remains as the host of the program, joined by Karen Schwarz for the live shows.

Coaches and hosts 

After the announcement of the return of the show, returning coach Eva Ayllón was the first one announced for the fourth season. Mike Bahía, contestant on the first season of La Voz Colombia, was then announced to join Ayllón in the coaching panel. Daniella Darcourt was later announced as the third coach of the show, and in 26 May, the final coach was announced to be Guillermo Dávila.

Cristian Rivero returned for his fourth season as host. Karen Schwarz joined Rivero in hosting the program during the final phase, the live shows.

Teams 
Color key

  Winner
  Runner-up
  Third place
  Fourth place
  Eliminated in the Live semi-finals
  Eliminated in the Live quarter-finals
  Eliminated in the Live playoffs
  Eliminated in the Live round of 32
  Stolen in the Knockouts
  Eliminated in the Knockouts
  Eliminated in the Battles
  Withdrew

Week 1

Blind auditions 
The blind auditions started on 14 June 2021. New in this season, the "block" button is introduced; each coach has three buttons which they can press in order to prevent another coach from getting the artist on her/his team.

Week 2

Week 3

Week 4

Week 5

Last blind auditions 

 Note: At the end of the blind auditions, Daniela did not use her third block.

Battles 
The battles round started on 14 July. This season's advisors were: Christian Yaipén for Team Eva, Danny Ocean for Team Mike, Mauri Stern for Team Guillermo, and Tito Nieves for Team Daniela. Meanwhile, unlike previous seasons, the 'steals' on the battles were removed this season. Contestants who win their battle advance to the knockouts.

Week 6

Week 7

Last battles

Knockouts 
The knockouts round started on 28 July. In this round, coaches were able to steal one losing artist from another team. Contestants who win their knockout or get stolen advance to the Live shows.

Week 8

Last knockouts

Live round of 32 (part one) 
The live shows began airing on 5 August, with the round of 32. This phase has two parts, each one with three nights of performances. The coaches divide their eight-members team into two groups of four, with one group of each team performing in a part. A team group performs in one of the first two nights. Per team, one artist is saved by the public and other is saved by their respective coach. On night three (elimination night), the remaining two artists per team perform, and the one with most votes from the public advances to the next round.

Week 9

Live round of 32 (part two)

Live playoffs (part one) 
In the playoffs, a two-parts phase with three nights of performances each, the coaches divide their six-members team into two groups of three, with one group of each team performing in a part. A team group performs in one of the first two nights. Only one artist, per team, is saved by the public, while the other two have the second chance to perform on night three, when each coach chooses one contestant to advance to the next round.

Week 10

Live playoffs (part two)

Live quarter-finals 
In the quarter-finals, the four members of two teams perform in one of the first two nights. Per team, two artists are saved, one by the public and another by their respective coach. On night three, the artists that were not initially saved have the second chance to perform and one artist (per team) is saved by their coach.

Week 11

Live semi-finals 
In the semi-finals, the three artists of two teams perform in one of the first two nights, and two artists are saved — one by the public and other by their coach — and the not chosen artist is eliminated. On night three, every advancing artist performs and one artist is chosen by their coach to go through to the grand finale.

Live finale 
In the finale, the public votes for their favourite artist. The one with most votes is named the voice of Peru.

Elimination chart

Color key 
Artist's info

  Team Daniela
  Team Guillermo
  Team Mike
  Team Eva

Result details

  Winner
  Runner-up
  Third place
  Fourth place
  Saved by public
  Saved by her/his coach
  Placed in the bottom two
  Eliminated

Overall

Per team

References 

p
2021 television seasons